Second Avenue is the second solo album from Lisa Moscatiello and was released in 2000.

Lisa Moscatiello's frequent collaborator Bev Stanton released an electronic deconstruction of Second Avenue in 2000 entitled Second Avenue Detour.

Awards 
Second Avenue won the 2000 Album of the Year Wammie, as well as the Wammie for Best Recording in the Contemporary Folk category.

Release notes 
"Lisa Moscatiello's rich and deep alto voice is the magical thread binding together Second Avenue. The shimmering arrangements featuring fiddle, bouzouki, and harp alongside acoustic, electric, and slide guitar reflect Lisa's background in Celtic music."

Reissue 
In 2002 Second Avenue was reissued on the Machine Heart Music label with a different running order and two extra tracks - "Little Maggie" and "In the Here and Now".

Track listing

2000 Wind River release

2002 Machine Heart Music reissue

Notes

Further reading
 
 

2000 albums
Lisa Moscatiello albums